2009 Hong Kong Community Shield was the first edition of the Hong Kong Community Shield. The game was a football match between the winners and the runners-up of the previous season's Hong Kong First Division League.

The match was played in Hong Kong Stadium, on 17 August 2009. The two opposing teams were 2008–09 Hong Kong First Division League winners South China and runners-up Kitchee.

Because of Typhoon Morakot, which was currently affecting Taiwan, a part of the ticket revenue was donated to two charities, the Hong Kong Red Cross and United Christian Hospital.

The game was won by Kitchee with a 2–0 victory over South China. The game's two goals were made by Spanish player Albert Virgili and Equatoguinean player Baruc Nsue.

Match details

See also
2008–09 Hong Kong First Division League

External links
Detail by HKFA
Match News by HKFA

Community Shield
Hong Kong Community Shield